South Korean pop duo TVXQ, known as  in Japanese releases, have released 7 Korean studio albums, 8 Japanese studio albums, one Korean EP, three Japanese compilations albums, 22 official Korean singles, and 49 official Japanese singles. They have collaborated with other artists for their album and promotional releases. TVXQ debuted as a five-piece boy band in di2003 under S.M. Entertainment and made their Japanese debut in 2005 under Avex Group. Aside from Korean and Japanese, TVXQ have also recorded Mandarin-language versions of their Korean singles.

Released songs

Sample and cover versions
 American singer Wayne Brady covered  "Beautiful Life" in 2007 is called Ordinary (Beautiful Ordinary Life) in full English version.
 Asian American singer Erik Carlson (half Finnish and Half Filipino as Finnapino)) of XPREIMENTAL ENTERTAINMENT sampled both  TVXQ's  "Beautiful Life" and  Wayne Brady's  "Ordinary" called "There U Are" in his self titled album in 2007.

See also
TVXQ singles discography
TVXQ albums discography
List of awards and nominations received by TVXQ

Notes

References

TVXQ
 
TVXQ